Mirehouse is a British surname. Notable people with the surname include:

 George Mirehouse (1863–1923), English cricketer
 William Mirehouse (1844–1925), English cricketer

First found in Cumberland, this Saxon surname survived with variations including: Miresike, Mirehouse, Mirus, Mirehous, as well as others.

See also
 Morehouse (surname)

References

Surnames of British Isles origin